This Is a Recording  may refer to:

This Is a Recording (Kevin Moore album)
This Is a Recording (Lily Tomlin album)
Intercept message, a telephone recording informing the caller that the call cannot be completed